The Andi Koysu ( - Andiyskoye Koysu,  - Andis Qoisu) is a river in Dagestan (Russia) and Georgia. It starts at the confluence of the rivers Pirikiti Alazani and Tushetis Alazani, near Omalo in the Tusheti region of Georgia. At its confluence with the Avar Koysu, near the village Gimry in central Dagestan, it forms the river Sulak.

References

Rivers of Dagestan
Rivers of Georgia (country)
International rivers of Europe
International rivers of Asia